Myra McDaniel (December 13, 1932 – February 25, 2010) was the first African American to be the Secretary of State of Texas.

Life
McDaniel was born in Philadelphia, Pennsylvania to Eva and Toronto Atwell. She attended the Philadelphia School for Girls. In 1954, she went on to receive her bachelor's degree in English from the University of Pennsylvania. In 1975, she received her Juris Doctor (J.D.)  degree from the  University of Texas School of Law at Austin. She married Dr. Reuben R. McDaniel in 1955, who was a Professor Management Science and Information Systems at the University of Texas at Austin. Myra McDaniel died of lung cancer on February 25, 2010.

Career
After graduating in 1954 from the University of Pennsylvania, she worked at Baldwin Wallace College and Indiana University.  She then went to the University of Texas School of Law, where she received her J.D. After receiving her J.D., she worked at the Texas Attorney General's office. She eventually became the Chief of the taxation division. Afterward, she entered private practice. However, she was appointed as General Counsel to the Governor of Texas by then-governor Mark White. In 1984, she went on to become the Secretary of State of Texas, and became the first African American to hold the position. With that appointment, she also became the then-highest-appointed African American to ever serve in the Texas government. She went on to enter private practice again in 1987, and at her firm, became the first African American woman to lead a major law firm as a managing partner.

Honors and awards
In 2017, McDaniel was awarded the Virgil C. Lott medal by the University of Texas School of Law.

References

External links 

 Interview with Ms. Myra McDaniel: The Secretary of State for Texas, 1984-11-28, In Black America; KUT Radio, American Archive of Public Broadcasting (WGBH and the Library of Congress)

Secretaries of State of Texas
African-American lawyers
1932 births
2010 deaths
20th-century American lawyers
20th-century African-American people
21st-century African-American people